Osche may refer to:
 the former name for the town of Osie now in Poland
 Günther Osche (1926–2009), a German evolutionary biologist